Jerome Baker (born 8 September 1991) is a Canadian professional soccer player who plays for S.League club Hougang United, as a striker.

References

1991 births
Living people
Soccer players from Toronto
Canadian soccer players
Canadian expatriate soccer players
Canadian expatriate sportspeople in Singapore
Expatriate footballers in Singapore
Singapore Premier League players
Association football forwards
Hougang United FC players
21st-century Canadian people